Pietro Musumeci (born 18 May 1920) was a general and deputy director of Italy's military intelligence agency, SISMI.

Musumeci was born in Catania on 18 May 1920. A member of Propaganda Due, Musumeci was convicted in 1985, along with other SISMI officers Francesco Pazienza and Giuseppe Belmonte, for embezzlement and criminal association. Musumeci and Belmonte were also convicted for possessing and transporting explosives. They tried to sidetrack the  investigations on the 1980 Bologna train station bombing by simulating an attempt with explosives on a Taranto-Milan train, in January 1981 (the bombing was voluntarily thwarted by order of Musumeci).

A further conviction came in 1988, when he was also sentenced for slandering said investigation. Although acquitted on appeals, this sentence was upheld by the Italian Supreme Court in 1995.

A 1984 parliamentary inquiry indicated that irregularities at SISMI included the charge that Musumeci used the Camorra to negotiate the release of Ciro Cirillo, a Christian-democratic politician who was kidnapped by the Red Brigades.

One of the members of Musumeci's office, colonel Camillo Guglielmi, was in the same street in which former Italian prime minister Aldo Moro was kidnapped, on 16 March 1978.

References

1920 births
Possibly living people
Italian generals
SISMI
Fellows of the American Physical Society